"The System Only Dreams in Total Darkness" is a song by American indie rock band The National. It was released as the lead single for their seventh studio album, Sleep Well Beast, at 12:01am Eastern Time on 11 May 2017. The song was written by Aaron Dessner, Matt Berninger, and Bryce Dessner and produced by Aaron Dessner (with co-production by Bryce Dessner, Matt Berninger, and Peter Katis). A music video for the song was released on the same day and was directed by Casey Reas. It was the band's first song to appear on any airplay chart in the United States, ultimately topping Billboards Adult Alternative Songs chart in August 2017 and peaking at No. 33 on Billboards Alternative Songs chart early the following month. The song is featured in soundtrack of the EA Sports video game FIFA 18.

Critical reception
On the day of its release Pitchfork named it Best New Track, noting that "The System Only Dreams in Total Darkness" is "heavy and urgent and surprisingly aggressive—and not just because of Aaron Dessner's gnarly guitar solo in the middle."

Also Paste magazine named it one of the five best songs of the week, placing it at position 4 and wrote: "Floating in with poignant piano chords and twitchy guitar, 'The System' features multiple instrumental layers, with trumpet fluttering over propulsive percussion and Matt Berninger's thundering baritone. It's a fine return to form."

The song was also cited as one of Barack Obama's favorite songs of 2017 in a Spotify playlist compiled by Obama at the end of the year.

Charts

Weekly charts

Year-end charts

References

The National (band) songs
2017 singles
2017 songs
4AD singles
Rock ballads
Songs written by Matt Berninger
Songs written by Aaron Dessner
Songs written by Bryce Dessner
Song recordings produced by Aaron Dessner
Song recordings produced by Bryce Dessner